Mireille Mary Wenger (born 1980 or 1981) is a South African politician who has been the Western Cape Provincial Minister of Finance and Economic Opportunities since May 2022 and a Democratic Alliance (DA) Member of the Western Cape Provincial Parliament since May 2014. She was Chief Whip of the Majority Party from May 2019 to May 2022.

Qualifications
Wenger holds a Master of Arts in International Studies from Stellenbosch University and a Master of Philosophy (MPhil) in Criminology, Law and Society from the University of Cape Town. She obtained a diploma in Political Science and Sociology from Sciences Po in France.

Political career
In 2014, she was elected to the Western Cape Provincial Parliament as a member of the Democratic Alliance. She took office as an MPP on 21 May 2014. Wenger was elected chairperson of the community safety committee.
 
After her re-election in  2019, she was appointed the chief whip of the DA caucus and consequently Chief Whip of the Majority Party. She assumed office on 22 May 2019. On 17 April 2022, Wenger was elected as the Chairperson of the Provincial Parliament's Ad-Hoc Committee on COVID-19.

On 22 April 2022, Premier Alan Winde announced that Wenger would be joining the provincial cabinet on 16 May 2022 as the Provincial Minister of Finance and Economic Opportunities as the incumbent Provincial Minister David Maynier would be moving to the Education portfolio to replace Debbie Schäfer, who announced her departure from the provincial government. The Provincial Parliament's Ad-Hoc Committee on COVID-19 disbanded on 10 May 2022. DA member Lorraine Botha replaced Wenger as Chief Whip of the Majority Party. Wenger was sworn into office on 16 May 2022.

Personal life
Wenger is married to Craig Kesson. They have one child.

References

External links

Living people
Year of birth missing (living people)
People from the Western Cape
21st-century South African politicians
Democratic Alliance (South Africa) politicians
Members of the Western Cape Provincial Parliament
Women members of provincial legislatures of South Africa
Stellenbosch University alumni
University of Cape Town alumni